"Don't Make Me Wait" is a song recorded by the Peech Boys in 1982. It was written by the band and produced by Paradise garage DJ Larry Levan. It was released by West End Records and peaked at No. 89 on the Billboard R&B singles chart and No. 49 on the UK Singles Chart.

"Don't Make Me Wait" received a respectable play at Paradise Garage. The song is characterized by overdubbed bass, soulful vocals, and gospel-like piano lines reminiscent of those in house music.

Track listing
12" vinyl
 US: West End / WES-22140

Personnel
Charles Walden  – engineer
Larry Levan, Michael de Benedictus - producers
Howie Weinberg at Masterdisk, New York – mastering
"Special thanks to: Robert P. Kasper"

Chart positions

References

1980s ballads
1982 singles
1982 songs
Post-disco songs
West End Records singles